Sedghi is a surname. Notable people with the surname include:

Amir Hossein Sedghi (born 1996), Iranian footballer
Arman Sedghi (born 1964), Iranian engineer and professor
Hassan Sedghi, Iranian academic
Hojjat Sedghi (born 1993), Iranian footballer

Surnames of Iranian origin